The Respect Issue is the second album by American metalcore band Emmure. The album was released on May 13, 2008, with pre-orders available on March 11. Kurt Angle, professional wrestler and former Olympic wrestler, is featured as a boxer on the cover art and throughout the inlay. Angle also wore an Emmure shirt during broadcasts of TNA Impact! in promotion of the album. This is also the last studio release to feature founding members Ben and Joe Lionetti, who left the band in May 2009.

It debuted at number 141 in the Billboard 200, selling over 5,000 copies.

Snuff 2: The Resurrection refers to a quote that Max California (played by Joaquin Phoenix) in the 1999 film 8MM.

Track listing

Personnel 
Emmure
 Frankie Palmeri - lead vocals
 Jesse Ketive - lead guitar
 Ben Lionetti - rhythm guitar
 Mark Davis - bass guitar
 Joe Lionetti - drums
Guests
 Gary Michel - additional vocals on 'Snuff 2: The Resurrection' and 'Tales from the 'Burg'
 Ryan Morgan - guitar solo on 'Chicago's Finest'
Production
 Produced, engineered, and mixed by Chris "Zeuss" Harris
 Mastered by Alan Douches at West West Side
 Management by Shawn Keith at Outerloop Management
 Photography by Matt Wysocki
 Photo Assistant by Jenni Lobb
 Art Direction And Layout by DoubleJ
 Booking by Amanda Fiore at TKO

References

2008 albums
Emmure albums
Victory Records albums
Albums produced by Chris "Zeuss" Harris